In Love, Every Pleasure Has Its Pain is a  1971 commedia all'italiana film directed by Gianfranco De Bosio. It is based on the comedy play La Betia by Angelo Beolco.

Cast 

Nino Manfredi: Nale 
Rosanna Schiaffino: Betìa  
Ljubiša Samardžić (credited as Smoki Samardì): Zilio
Eva Ras: Tamia 
Mario Carotenuto: Tacio 
Olivera Marković: Menega
Lino Toffolo: Bazzarello 
Boban Petrović: Menegazzo 
Franco Pesce: Barba Scatti

See also 
 
 List of Italian films of 1971

References

External links

1971 films
1971 comedy films
Commedia all'italiana
Films scored by Carlo Rustichelli
Films set in Veneto
1970s Italian films